The 2011–12 Denver Pioneers men's basketball team represented the University of Denver during the 2011–12 NCAA Division I men's basketball season. The Pioneers, led by fifth year head coach Joe Scott, played their home games at Magness Arena and were members of the West Division of the Sun Belt Conference. They finished the season 22–9, 11–5 in Sun Belt play to finish in second place in the West Division. They lost in the semifinals of the Sun Belt Basketball tournament to WKU. Despite having 22 wins, the Pioneers did not accept an invitation to a post season tournament.

This was Denver's final year as a member of the Sun Belt as they will join the Western Athletic Conference on July 1, 2012.

Roster

Schedule
 
|-
!colspan=9| Regular season

|-
!colspan=9| 2012 Sun Belt Conference men's basketball tournament

References

2011-12
2011–12 Sun Belt Conference men's basketball season
2011 in sports in Colorado
2012 in sports in Colorado